This is a complete episode listing of the anime television series Starship Operators, created by J.C.Staff. The series premiered January 5, 2005 on TV Tokyo in Japan.

Episode list

References

Starship Operators